The 2017 Aragon motorcycle Grand Prix was the fourteenth round of the 2017 MotoGP season. It was held at the Ciudad del Motor de Aragón in Alcañiz on September 24, 2017. This was the 900th race to contribute to the Grand Prix motorcycle racing championship.

Classification

MotoGP

Moto2

Moto3
The race was shortened from 20 to 13 laps due to the Sunday warm-up sessions being delayed because of fog covering the track.

 María Herrera withdrew from the event before the qualifying session due to effects of the broken collarbone suffered at Misano.

Championship standings after the race

MotoGP
Below are the standings for the top five riders and constructors after round fourteen has concluded.

Riders' Championship standings

Constructors' Championship standings

 Note: Only the top five positions are included for both sets of standings.

Moto2

Moto3

Notes

References

Aragon
Aragon Motorcycle Grand Prix
Aragon motorcycle Grand Prix
Aragon motorcycle Grand Prix